Roger Skinner (fl. 1388) of Bath, Somerset was an English politician and craftsman.

He was a Member (MP) of the Parliament of England for Bath in September 1388. As of 1379, he was living in Northgate Street, Bath, according to the poll tax assessments.

References

Year of birth missing
Year of death missing
English MPs September 1388
People from Bath, Somerset